Clery is the surname of: 

Jean-Baptiste Cléry (1759–18??), the personal valet to King Louis XVI
Jeanne Clery (died 1986), whose death was the impetus for the Clery Act
Corinne Cléry (born 1950), a French actress

Clery may also refer to: 

The Clery Act of United States law
Clerys, an Irish department store

See also
Clary (disambiguation)
Ó Cléirigh